Oh Youn-hyung (born 29 October 1984) is a South Korean rugby union player. He plays as a fly-half for the South Korea national team.

External links 
 

1984 births
Living people
South Korean rugby union players
Rugby union fly-halves
Korea University alumni
Asian Games medalists in rugby union
Rugby union players at the 2014 Asian Games
Asian Games bronze medalists for South Korea
Medalists at the 2014 Asian Games